The American Osteopathic Board of Proctology (AOBPR) is an organization that provides board certification to qualified Doctors of Osteopathic Medicine (D.O.) who specialize in the medical and surgical treatment of disorders of the anus, colon, and rectum of the gastrointestinal tract (proctologists). The board is one of 18 medical specialty certifying boards of the American Osteopathic Association Bureau of Osteopathic Specialists approved by the American Osteopathic Association (AOA), and was established in 1941. As of April 2011, there were 25 osteopathic proctologists certified by the AOBPR.

Board certification
To become board certified in proctology, candidates must have completed an AOA-approved residency in proctology and one year of practice as a licensed proctologist.  Additionally, candidates must have successfully completed the required oral and written examinations. Since 2004, board certified osteopathic proctologists must renew their certification every ten years to avoid expiration of their board certified status. Physicians certified by the AOBPR are known as fellows of the American Osteopathic College of Proctology.

See also
 American Osteopathic Association Bureau of Osteopathic Specialists

References

External links
 The American Osteopathic College of Proctology website

Osteopathic medical associations in the United States
Organizations established in 1941
Medical and health professional associations in Chicago
Colorectal surgery